Filmography of the South African, British-based actor and comedian Sid James.

Black Memory (1947) as Eddie Clinton
The October Man (1947) as Man Crossing Railway Bridge (uncredited)
Night Beat (1947) as Nixon
No Orchids for Miss Blandish (1948) as Ted (uncredited)
The Small Back Room (1949) as 'Knucksie' Mortan, barkeeper
Once a Jolly Swagman (1949) as Rowton
Paper Orchid (1949) as Freddy Evans
Give Us This Day (1949) as Murdin
Man in Black (1949) as Henry Clavering / Hodson
Last Holiday (1950) as Joe Clarence
The Lady Craved Excitement (1950) as Carlo
Talk of a Million (1951) as John C. Moody
The Galloping Major (1951) as Bottomley - the bookmaker
The Lavender Hill Mob (1951) as Lackery
Lady Godiva Rides Again (1951) as Lew Beeson
The Magic Box (1951) as Sergeant in Storeroom (cameo) 
I Believe in You (1952) as Sergeant Boy
The Tall Headlines (1952) as Mr. Spencer 
Emergency Call (1952) as Danny Marks
Time Gentlemen, Please! (1952) as Eric Hace
Gift Horse (1952) as Ned Hardy, Owner Golden Bull
Father's Doing Fine (1952) as Taxi Driver
Venetian Bird (1952) as Bernardo
Miss Robin Hood (1952) as Sidney
Cosh Boy (1953) as Police Sergeant
The Yellow Balloon (1953) as Barrow Boy
The Titfield Thunderbolt (1953) as Hawkins
The Flanagan Boy (1953) as Sharkey
The Square Ring (1953) as Adams
Will Any Gentleman...? (1953) as Mr. Hobson
Park Plaza 605 (1953) as Supt. Williams
Is Your Honeymoon Really Necessary? (1953) as Hank Hanlon
Escape by Night (1953) as Gino Rossi
The Wedding of Lilli Marlene (1953) as Fennimore Hunt
The Weak and the Wicked (1954) as Syd Baden  
The House Across the Lake (1954) as Beverly Forrest
The Rainbow Jacket (1954) as Harry
Father Brown (1954) as Bert Parkinson
Seagulls Over Sorrento ( Crest Of The Wave, US Release ) (1954) as Seaman Charlie 'Badge' Badger
For Better, for Worse (1954) as The Foreman
The Belles of St. Trinian's (1954) as Benny
The Crowded Day (1954) as Nightwatchman
Orders Are Orders (1954) as Ed Waggermeyer
Aunt Clara (1954) as Honest Sid
Out of the Clouds (1955) as The Gambler
The Glass Cage (1955) as Tony Lewis
A Kid for Two Farthings (1955) as Ice Berg
John and Julie (1955) as Mr. Pritchett
The Deep Blue Sea (1955) as Man outside bar
Joe MacBeth (1955) as Banky
It's a Great Day (1955) as Harry Mason 
A Yank in Ermine (1955) as Nightclub manager
Ramsbottom Rides Again (1956) as Black Jake
Wicked as They Come (1956) as Frank Allenborg
Trapeze (1956) as Harry the Snake Charmer
The Iron Petticoat (1956) as Paul
Dry Rot (1956) as Flash Harry
The Extra Day (1956) as Barney West
Interpol (1957) as Joe - First Bartender
The Smallest Show on Earth (1957) as Mr. Hogg
Quatermass 2 (1957) as Jimmy Hall
The Shiralee (1957) as Luck
Hell Drivers (1957) as Dusty
The Story of Esther Costello (1957) as Ryan
Campbell's Kingdom (1957) as Tim
A King in New York (1957) as Johnson - TV Advertieer 
The Silent Enemy (1958) as Chief Petty Officer Thorpe
Another Time, Another Place (1958) as Jake Kleim
Next to No Time (1958) as Albert, Cabin Steward
The Man Inside (1958) as Franklin
I Was Monty's Double (1958) as Porter Y.M.C.A.
The Sheriff of Fractured Jaw (1958) as The Drunk
Make Mine a Million (1959) as Sid Gibson
Too Many Crooks (1959) as Sid
I'm All Right Jack (1959) as a worker
The 39 Steps (1959) as Perce
Idol on Parade (1959) as Herbie
Upstairs and Downstairs (1959) as P.C. Edwards
Desert Mice (1959) as Bert Bennett
Tommy the Toreador (1959) as Cadena
Look at Life (film series) (1959) : 'Market Place' : Narrator
Look at Life (film series) (1959): 'Dustman's Day': Narrator
And the Same to You (1960) as Sammy GattCarry On Constable (1960) as Sgt. Frank WilkinsWatch Your Stern (1960) as Chief Petty Officer MundyThe Pure Hell of St Trinian's (1960) as Alphonse O'ReillyLook at Life (film series) (1961): 'Getting a Move On': NarratorCarry On Regardless (1961) as Bert HandyA Weekend with Lulu (1961) as Café PatronThe Green Helmet (1961) as Richie LaunderDouble Bunk (1961) as SidRaising the Wind (1961) as SidWhat a Carve Up! (1961) as Syd ButlerWhat a Whopper (1961) as Harry SuttonCarry On Cruising (1962) as Captain Wellington Crowther We Joined the Navy (1962) as Dance Instructor (uncredited)Carry On Cabby (1963) as Charlie HawkinsThe Beauty Jungle (1964) as 'Butlin' Judge Carry On Cleo (1964) as Mark AntonyTokoloshe (1965) as Harry ParsonsThe Big Job (1965) as George BrainCarry On Cowboy (1965) as Johnny Finger, the Rumpo KidThree Hats for Lisa (1966) as Sid MarksWhere the Bullets Fly (1966) as Mortuary AttendantDon't Lose Your Head (1966) as Sir Rodney Ffing / The Black FingernailCarry On Doctor (1967) as Charlie RoperCarry On Up the Khyber (1968) as Sir Sidney Ruff-DiamondCarry On Camping (1969) as Sid BoggleCarry On Again Doctor (1969) as Gladstone ScrewerCarry On Up the Jungle (1970) as Bill BooseyStop Exchange (1970) as The TrampCarry On Loving (1970) as Sidney BlissCarry On Henry (1971) as King Henry VIIICarry On at Your Convenience (1971) as Sid PlummerCarry On Matron (1972) as Sid CarterBless This House (1972) as Sid AbbotCarry On Abroad (1972) as Vic FlangeCarry On Girls (1973) as Sidney FiddlerCarry On Dick'' (1974) as Big Dick Turpin / Reverend Flasher

References

Male actor filmographies
British filmographies